Michael Hopfes (born 11 February 1976), is a German former competitive figure skater who competed in men's singles. He competed at five Champions Series/Grand Prix events and placed 21st at the 1997 World Championships.

Results
GP: Champions Series / Grand Prix

External links
  Official page

1976 births
German male single skaters
Living people
People from Wolfratshausen
Sportspeople from Upper Bavaria